"If I Knew", 1969 song by The Monkees, from their album, The Monkees Present
 "If I Knew", 2013 Bruno Mars song from his album Unorthodox Jukebox